The Desna is a river in Moscow Oblast, Russia. It is a left tributary of the Guslitsa (Nerskaya's tributary). The Desna River freezes up in November–December and stays under the ice until April.

Source of the river is in the Voskresensky District near the meeting point of the borders of three districts of the Moscow Oblast Voskresensky, Yegoryevsky and Orekhovo-Zuyevsky. Flows all over North, Desna running into Guslitsa about the village of Tsaplyno.

The Orekhovo-Zuyevsky District's villages: Mosyagino, Chichevo, Baryshevo, Kostenevo, Bezzubovo, Yuryatino are situated on the Desna.

In the higher and middle parts of the stream it has almost entirely lost its forest cover: upstream — because of the extraction of phosphorites, in the middle part — because of the plowing.

Sources 

 Russian: Vagner B. B. Rivers and Lakes of the Moscow Area. — М.:Veche, 2007, — p. 92. .
 Russian: Moscow Oblast. Detailed Atlas. M 1:200 000. —  М.:Eksmo, 2008, — p. 40. .

Rivers of Moscow Oblast